The 2021 Virginia attorney general election was held on November 2, 2021, to elect the next attorney general of Virginia. Democratic Attorney General Mark Herring attempted to win a third term. Herring initially planned to run for governor, but decided to run for re-election. Herring faced Republican nominee Jason Miyares in the general election. Herring conceded defeat at 5:02 PM EST the following day, November 3. Miyares became the first Cuban-American and Hispanic to be elected to statewide office in Virginia. Miyares was later sworn in on January 15, 2022.

Democratic primary

Candidates

Nominee 
 Mark Herring, incumbent attorney general

Eliminated in primary 
 Jay Jones, state delegate for Virginia's 89th House of Delegates district

Declined 
 Shannon Taylor, Henrico County commonwealth's attorney

Endorsements

Debates

Mark Herring and Jay Jones agreed to one debate. The debate started off with Mark Herring started off talking about his record and saying what he has done about certain cases vs what Jones was doing at the time. Jay Jones started off talking about his endorsement from Governor at the time, Ralph Northam, and claiming Herring's past didn't matter for what was happening in the present.

Issues
Herring and Jones agreed on almost every issue asked to them. When the rebuttals came though, Herring would often claim that Jones didn’t support something when he was on the legislature and Jones would point to an example where they agreed on it in the past, such as a big. When Jones rebutted Herring, Jones claimed that Herring didn’t begin on the issue until it was in the political atmosphere.

Here are a couple examples below.

Polling

Results

Republican convention

Candidates

Nominated at convention 

 Jason Miyares, state delegate for Virginia's 82nd House of Delegates district

Defeated at convention 
Leslie Haley, Chesterfield County supervisor
 Chuck Smith, attorney, nominee for Virginia's 3rd congressional district in 2010, and candidate for Attorney General in 2017
 Jack White, preacher and attorney

Declined 
Bill Stanley, state senator for Virginia's 20th Senate district

Results

General election

Endorsements

General election Debates
Mark Herring and Jason Miyares agreed to one debate. It was a town hall like event where people could ask questions about important issues.

Polling
Graphical summary

Results

See also 

 2021 Virginia elections
 2021 Virginia gubernatorial election
 2021 Virginia lieutenant gubernatorial election
2021 Virginia House of Delegates election

Notes  

Partisan clients

References

External links
Official campaign websites
 Mark Herring (D) for Attorney General
 Jason Miyares (R) for Attorney General

2021 Virginia elections
2021
Virginia